Christian Markle Straub (1804June 7, 1860) was an American politician from Pennsylvania who served as a Democratic member of the U.S. House of Representatives for Pennsylvania's 11th congressional district from 1853 to 1855.

Early life and education
Straub was born in Milton, Pennsylvania to Andrew II and Mary Eveline Walter.  He studied law and was admitted to the bar. He served as prothonotary of Schuylkill County, Pennsylvania in 1845 and sheriff of Schuylkill County in 1849.

Career
Straub was elected as a Democrat to the Thirty-third congress. He was a member of the Pennsylvania State Senate for the 28th district from 1855 to 1856 and the 7th district from 1857 to 1858.  He died in Washington, D.C. and is interred at the Charles Baber Cemetery in Pottsville, Pennsylvania.

Sources

The Political Graveyard

|-

1804 births
1860 deaths
19th-century American politicians
Burials at Charles Baber Cemetery
Democratic Party members of the United States House of Representatives from Pennsylvania
Pennsylvania lawyers
Pennsylvania prothonotaries
Democratic Party Pennsylvania state senators
People from Northumberland County, Pennsylvania
People from Schuylkill County, Pennsylvania
19th-century American lawyers